Nnaji is a surname. Notable people with the name include:

Bartholomew Nnaji (born 1956), Nigerian scientist
David Nnaji, Nigerian film maker, actor and writer
Genevieve Nnaji (born 1979), Nigerian actress
Gilbert Nnaji (born 1966), Nigerian politician
Peace Uzoamaka Nnaji (born 1952), Nigerian politician
Scott Nnaji, Nigerian women's basketball coach
Zeke Nnaji (born 2001), American basketball player

See also
Naji, given name and surname